This is a list of games for the ColecoVision video game console.
In total, the following games are known to exist:
  U.S. releases
 1 U.S. very limited release
  foreign/Canadian releases
  TeleGames exclusive releases
 22 prototype and unreleased games

See Lists of video games for related lists.

Official

U.S.
The following  games were released on the U.S. market:

U.S. limited release 
The following game was a very limited releases inside the U.S.:

Non-US
The following games were exclusively released in non-US markets:

Dina / Telegames 
Dina is a clone of both the ColecoVision and the Sega SG-1000 consoles, with one cartridge slot for each platform, and came bundled with the game Meteoric Shower, which was built into the system. It was later sold in the United States by Telegames as the Telegames Personal Arcade.

The following games were in the ColecoVision format:

Unreleased prototypes 
Dig Dug (Atarisoft)

Notes

References 

ColecoVision